The Shape I'm In may refer to:
"The Shape I'm In" (The Band song)
"The Shape I'm In" (Joe Nichols song)
"The Shape I'm In", song by Johnny Restivo
"Shape I'm In" (Jo Jo Zep & The Falcons song), a single by Jo Jo Zep & The Falcons from 1979
"Shape I'm In", a song by Arc Angels on the album Arc Angels
Shape I'm In: The Complete Anthology, a greatest hits album by Jo Jo Zep & The Falcons, 1997